Tomoxia serval is a species of beetle in the genus Tomoxia of the family Mordellidae. It was described by Thomas Say in 1835.

References

Tomoxia
Beetles described in 1835
Taxa named by Thomas Say